Cow Creek is an unincorporated community and census-designated place in Sully County, South Dakota, United States. Its population was 30 as of the 2010 census. The community is located on the eastern shore of Lake Oahe.

Geography

Demographics

References

Unincorporated communities in Sully County, South Dakota
Unincorporated communities in South Dakota
Census-designated places in Sully County, South Dakota
Census-designated places in South Dakota